Ontario Place is an entertainment venue, event venue, and park in Toronto, Ontario, Canada. The venue is located on three artificial landscaped islands just off-shore in Lake Ontario, south of Exhibition Place, and southwest of Downtown Toronto. It opened on May 22, 1971, and operated as a theme park centered around Ontario themes and family attractions until 2012 when the Government of Ontario announced that it would close for redevelopment. It has since reopened as a park without admission but without several of the old attractions. The Government of Ontario is currently considering further redevelopment of the site.

Since the closure as a theme park, several of the venue's facilities have remained open, once reopened, and one section was redeveloped. The Budweiser Stage operates during the summer season. The Cinesphere, the original IMAX theatre, reopened with new projection equipment and shows films regularly. On the East Island, Trillium Park and the William Davis Trail opened in 2017. A marina, sheltered by three sunken lake freighters operates seasonally at the site. The exhibit "pods", several pavilions suspended above a lagoon, have remained closed after the closure of the Atlantis event facility. While much of the West Island's facilities are permanently closed, some of the natural spaces are now being used for recreation. Occasionally special events are hosted in the west island village.

History 
The Ontario Place theme park operated annually during the summer months from 1971 until 2011. Designed originally to promote the Province of Ontario through exhibits and entertainment, its focus changed over time to be that of a theme park for families with a water park, a children's play area, and amusement rides. Exhibits in the pods were discontinued and the pods became a venue for private events. The Forum concert stage had long been a primary draw to Ontario Place in its early years as it offered free concerts by a wide variety of prominent artists, for free with the price of admission to the park. Structured as a true amphitheater with seating on all sides and a recessed stage that was round and revolved during concerts, all seats offered an equal view of the stage and were offered on a first come first served basis. In the 1990s, despite the vocal protests of Eb Zeidler, the architect of the park among others, the Forum was torn down and replaced by the (misleadingly named) Amphitheatre, in truth a static proscenium arch stage with banked ticketed seating. After a long period of declining attendance, the Government of Ontario closed the facility except for its music venue and marina after the 2011 season.

Background 

Built in 1926, the CNE Ontario Government Building displayed exhibits about Ontario at the annual Canadian National Exhibition (CNE). After the success of the Ontario Pavilion at Expo 67 in Montreal, the Government of Ontario decided to replace the CNE building with a new state-of-the-art showcase. The government at first considered moving the Ontario Pavilion to a site on Toronto Island but instead decided at the instigation of Jim Ramsay, to build a facility elsewhere on the waterfront. Ontario Premier John Robarts announced the project at the opening of the CNE in August 1968.

The park itself was originally conceived as an onshore exhibit, but this idea was discarded in favour of five large, architecturally unique, three-level pods in an aquatic setting somewhat similar in concept to Montreal's Expo 67 grounds (which were in the middle of the Saint Lawrence River). These pods initially housed various Ontario-themed exhibits. The first model displayed to the government dismayed director Jim Ramsay: 

The original plans were estimated to cost  to construct. Plans for the facility grew to include the Forum outdoor amphitheater, marina, nine restaurants, nine snack bars, three land rides, pedal and tour boats and an additional  of landfill.

Design and construction 

The park was built by the  Ontario Department of Trade and Development. The architects were Craig, Zeidler; Strong, the structural engineers were Gordon Dowdell Associates, the landscape architects were Hough, Stansbury and Associates, and the general contractor was Secant Construction. Construction started on March 17, 1969.

During the design phase, a difficult design problem developed. The cost of the open-water pod foundations alone (at the time, estimated at ) would consume almost the entire budget for the pods' construction. Architect Eb Zeidler was faced with a dilemma: how to construct the pods without the necessary budget. Zeidler developed an innovative solution: after a trip to the Caribbean, he realized that a "barrier reef" concept would cut down on wave action from the lake enough to reduce the cost of the pods' foundation to 1/10 of the original open-water estimate. After some quarrels with the Toronto Harbour Commission (due to the dangers of the unseen reef to shipping), the reef plan was modified to incorporate three artificial "barrier islands" made from city landfill.

The five steel and aluminum pavilion pods are square with  sides. Tension cables support the short-span trusses. They sit on concrete filled caissons, driven  into the lake's bedrock. Each of the pavilions is connected to one another and the land by glazed steel bridges. Ontario Place was designed to have a modular use and appearance. Zeidler says that the structures were designed to "give an illusion of dimensionless space, exploiting technology to shape the society of tomorrow." 

The Forum, an outdoor concert venue, was featured on a central hub-island, while a children's village would occupy an eastern island. A commercial section overlooked the water, with modular construction for shops and restaurants to the west. All would be connected by an intricately planned set of walkways and bridges. In addition, each island would have a unique colour scheme, and the entire complex was later infused with the brilliant colours and graphic design that was typical of the late 1960s and early 1970s. The children's village was designed by Eric McMillan and cost $700,000.

The Forum theatre sat 3,000 and had additional grass 'seats'. The roof structure was a hyperbolic paraboloid positioned on cement bastions.  It covered a  revolving stage, giving near 360 degree sightlines. The roof was made out of tongue and groove plywood, covered by copper sheathing.

Landscape architect Michael Hough overlaid a scale model of the University of Toronto's walking paths onto the Ontario Place plans to check for appropriate walking distances. This ensured that comfortable rest areas were placed appropriately so that children and the elderly would not need to walk too far without a comfortable seat. Ontario Place operated a rubber-wheeled tractor train and a boat to take visitors between key points on the various islands.

Prevailing wind and wave conditions were also considered in the design, a scale model of which was tested in the University of Toronto's wind tunnel. Large earthwork berms planted with tall native Ontario trees were created to shelter walkways from the prevailing southwesterly winds. To the south, a cost-effective and theme-congruent plan to sink three large obsolete Great Lakes shipping vessels was implemented, which sheltered the artificial harbour from intense open-lake waves. (The same technique would later be used on Toronto Island and the Outer Harbour.)

There was originally some controversy about allowing a public facility to house an upscale boating dock within the new artificial harbour. However, supporters of the plan believed that the dock's integration into Ontario Place would tie the location closer to the lake via boating activity, and improve the general ambience.

At Expo 70 in Osaka, Japan, the new IMAX movie technology was first exhibited. A great success, it was decided to build the first permanent IMAX installation at Ontario Place. The Cinesphere, an 800-seat theatre, was built. Its building is a 'spherical triodetic dome', with a  outer radius, and a  inner radius. The dome is supported by prefabricated steel aluminum alloy tubes.

The design of Ontario Place has won a long list of awards including ones from the International Committee for Documentation and Conservation of Buildings of the Modern Movement, the Royal Architectural Institute of Canada, The National Trust — Prix du XXe Siècle, and the American Society of Landscape Architects. In 2014, the Ontario government's Ministry of Culture, Tourism and Sport declared Ontario Place to be a "cultural heritage landscape of provincial significance."

Opening
When Ontario Place opened on May 22, 1971, the eastern island's children's village was not yet built, postponed to July, and finally opened for the 1972 season. The first-year admission price: $1.00 for adults, $0.50 for students, $0.25 for children 6–12

To commemorate the opening of the theme park and promote the province of Ontario, a multi-media exhibition was created and presented inside the pavilion. Dolores Claman wrote the music and Richard Morris wrote lyrics for the music to this presentation, entitled "Theme from Ontario Place".  "Theme from Ontario Place" was subsequently released by the Ontario Department of Trade and Development as a double-sided 45RPM vinyl record. It was manufactured by Quality Records (OP1971), side A containing a "Pop" version and Side B an "Easy Listening" recording. A photo of the still under construction Ontario Place was used on the cover. The purpose-built Imax theatre premiered a specially commissioned film North of Superior, an 18-minute film depicting life in Northern Ontario and its first season over 1.1 million people viewed the film.

In its first year, attendance was 2.5 million. However, the park had higher than expected costs and ran a deficit of $2.2 million. Winter screenings at Cinesphere were "financially successful." The Government of Ontario raised the admission from $1 to $1.50 for adults and 50 cents to 75 cents for youth. Manager James Ramsay was replaced and returned to the Ministry of Trade and Development. Two government-run restaurants that had lost money were leased to a private operator for the second season. During the first year, visitors to the CNE had to pay admission to enter Ontario Place. Starting in the second year, admission to the CNE included free admission to Ontario place.

Changes over time 

The park was altered considerably since its inception. Redevelopment occurred on all three islands of the park; the pod buildings themselves were eventually closed to exhibit space and rented out as the "Atlantis" private event facility.

In 1980, the "Ontario North Now" exhibit was built on the west island to showcase Northern Ontario.  It was a combination of inter-connected silo-like buildings, topped with domes reminiscent of the Cinesphere, connected by overhead walkways, and a smaller domed movie theatre. In 1984, a boat-based water ride was added, along with a smaller exhibition center consisting of three concrete silo-like buildings. A large reflecting pool nearby was drained and used to house the addition of a major "climber" structure, a smaller stage for kids shows and several other kid-oriented attractions, reducing the complete separation of areas that had been featured in the original design.

The outdoor in-the-round concert stage, The Forum, was torn down and replaced with the  million Molson Amphitheatre in 1995, a much larger facility based on a bandshell design. An additional "Echo Beach" outdoor music venue was added to the north shore of the east island in 2011.

On the east island, the original children's area, which was primarily "non-powered", has largely been removed. The large wood-and-rope climber area was replaced with the large "Soak City" waterpark, the first water park in Ontario. Several small fair-ground rides were later added. The large tension structure tent that covered most of the children's park was removed in 2009/10, leaving a large open area with a new stage. Many of the concrete bollards used to secure the various tents and structures can still be seen.

Operating deficit and attendance
Although proposed as a tourist attraction to promote Ontario, the park's subsidy nevertheless was a consistent concern of the Government of Ontario. The first season ran a deficit of $2.2 million, which led to an increase in admission prices the following season. In 1978, Ontario Place ran a deficit of $2.75 million while still charging $2.50 for adult admission. In the seasons of 1988 and 1989, Patti Starr, Ontario Place chair, reduced the deficit by $1.4 million by privatizing retail sales and fast-food operations, cutting advertising and increasing fees. In 1994, the Forum was torn down for the larger Molson Amphitheatre, in part to reduce the park's $4.5 million annual deficit. In 1997, Ontario Place's general manager Max Beck suggested a merger with Exhibition Place to save money. Ontario Finance Minister Jim Flaherty proposed selling off Ontario Place. In 2003, the subsidy was $3 million.

Attendance was another concern for park management and new attractions were regularly introduced to gain new interest. However, attendance declined from 3 million annually in the 1970s, to 2.5 million in 1985, 2.1 million in 1989. By 2004, attendance had declined to one million annually. The Ontario Government appointed former Toronto Mayor David Crombie to revitalize the park. In its last summer operating season, attendance was 563,000.

When the Ontario Gaming Commission was proposing a casino in downtown Toronto in 2012, one site mentioned was Ontario Place as a solution to declining attendance and revenues. The downtown casino was eventually stopped by opposition at Toronto City Council. The casino idea was also opposed by border cities in Ontario with existing casinos.

2010 refurbishment 
From the fall of 2010 through to the fall of 2011, over $10 million was spent on improvements. These included:

 a significant refreshing and expansion of the waterpark. Froster Soak City added a new "family" waterslide, an outdoor "spa pool" and waterfall, and over 100 metres of newly landscaped beach and public promenades. These upgrades expanded Soak City's variety and added new views of the Toronto downtown waterfront. The new slide, called "Topsy Turvy", was purchased from ProSlide Technology of Ottawa, Ontario. Topsy Turvy was recognized as the "2010 Best New Waterslide" from the International Association of Amusement Parks and Attractions (IAAPA). The installation of Topsy Turvy and the engineering systems needed for its operation was completed in October 2011, too late for the 2011 final season;
 upgrades to the Cinesphere. The original projection system was replaced by state-of-the-art IMAX 3D film technology by Toronto architecture firm Gow Hastings Architects, making Cinesphere the largest 3D theatre in Canada and second largest in North America. New sound systems, seats, concession areas, and interiors were also added;
 introduction of an "in-habitat" ecology, conservation, and animal care exhibit called the Eco-Learning Centre. A former arcade building, founded and created by Jaime Carnevale, the Eco-Learning Centre was established in a lagoon area of Ontario Place as a fun and informative "edutainment" attraction, and was created with displays by the World Wildlife Fund, the Toronto and Region Conservation Authority, the Royal Ontario Museum, Parks Canada, the Toronto Humane Society, The Recycling Council of Ontario, The Toronto Wildlife Centre, Earth Rangers and the Ministry of Natural Resources. The Eco-Learning Centre attracted over 300,000 visitors in its first year of operation.
 construction of Echo Beach

Investments were made in entertainment, marketing and sponsorship for the 40th-anniversary celebrations. Free grounds admission was offered to the public for the first time in 20 years. Live entertainment performances were quadrupled, to over 2,000. Advertising was reinstated, with a new ad campaign developed by Draft FCB of Toronto. A significant sponsorship of the 40th birthday celebration by CTV generated over $1,500,000 in extra advertising value. Ontario Place was recognized in 2011 by IAAPA as a worldwide finalist for a "Brass Ring Award" in the category of "Best Integrated Marketing Campaign."

The results of this effort generated an improvement in attendance numbers, park revenues, and public perceptions of Ontario Place in 2011. Total park attendance increased 9% to 880,001 despite a below average year for concerts at the Molson Canadian Amphitheatre and a decline in cross-over attendance from the Canadian National Exhibition. Core park attendance increased by 72% to 563,362. First-time visitor attendance increased even more, at 89%. Revenues in all categories increased by double-digit figures, despite the fact that there was no charge for actual admission to the grounds.

Scores from interview-based research into visitor perceptions also improved strongly. Favourable response to the question, "Ontario Place has changed for the better", increased by 43%, as did, "Ontario Place is my favourite entertainment park in the GTA", at 50% up. Perceptions of park cleanliness and general upkeep improved, by 34% and 37%, respectively.

Closure of theme park and redevelopment

In the summer of 2010, the Government of Ontario issued a Request for information calling for ideas from private bidders to completely redevelop the park. Ontario Place general manager Tim Casey told the Toronto Star that "2011 will be our 40th anniversary. It definitely needs a revitalization, that’s no surprise. It’s a blank slate, we’re open to just about anything.” A formal Request for proposals process began that fall. The government intends to transform the park from a largely seasonal facility to a year-round attraction. The redevelopment was to have included the tearing down of the Cinesphere as well as other long-standing attractions.

On February 1, 2012, the government announced that the public sections of the park would be closed and redeveloped, with a target date of 2017, the year of Canada's 150th anniversary. John Tory was announced as the chair of a Minister's Advisory Panel on Revitalization.  All Ontario Place facilities were closed except for the marina, the Molson Canadian Amphitheatre, the Atlantis entertainment venue and parking.

Following the provincial elections in June 2014, the government announced the plans in July for Ontario Place to be developed as an urban parkland with Molson Canadian Amphitheatre, Cinesphere and the pods retained.

The West Channel at Ontario Place was a venue for the 2015 Pan American Games (Athletics -marathon/race walk, cycling (road race), triathlon (cycling/run), open water swimming, triathlon (swim), water skiing and 2015 Parapan American Games (Cycling)). Minor and temporary upgrades were made to accommodate use during the games.
Construction was begun in March on the park and a waterfront path, which was named the William G. Davis Trail, after the Ontario premier who opened the original Ontario Place in 1971.

In 2017, portions of the East Island were transformed from a parking lot into Trillium Park. The new park included the  William G. Davis Trail, which opened in June 2017. In November 2017, the Cinesphere re-opened with showings of Dunkirk and North of Superior as part of a regular schedule of weekend programming. The Cinesphere's screen was replaced and a new "IMAX with laser" projector was installed.

In early 2018, the Government of Ontario led by Liberal Premier Kathleen Wynne solicited proposals as to new purposes for Ontario Place, but those could not include condominiums or a casino. After the Progressive Conservatives were elected in June, an announcement was made of plans to dissolve the Ontario Place Corporation. This follows the province indicating interest in establishing a casino on the lands. In November, Finance Minister Vic Fedeli suggested that the government was open to considering a new purpose for the park, without the restrictions that had been set by the previous government.

In December 2018, the Government of Ontario appointed James Ginou, a Toronto businessman and Progressive Conservative fund-raiser, as the new chair of the Board of Ontario. He had previously served in the position from 1997 until 2003. In 2019, the Government of Ontario announced that it would develop a rapid-transit line (the "Ontario Line") connecting Ontario Place to downtown Toronto and further north-east to the Ontario Science Centre. The line is targeted to open in 2027.

In May 2019, at an announcement held in the Cinesphere, the Government of Ontario released a call for proposals to redevelop Ontario Place with "big, bold ideas". Proposals must not include residential units, a casino and must not require a specific monetary outlay or subsidy by the Government of Ontario. Proposals must preserve the existing amount of parkland included in the Trillium Park, preserve the existing Budweiser Stage, but otherwise permit any type of changes, subject to approval.

Also in May 2019, Toronto city council voted 25–0 to list Ontario Place on Toronto's heritage property register. However the listing does not offer any legal protections.

World Monuments Fund included Ontario Place on its 2020 World Monuments Watch program alongside 24 heritage sites around the globe “in need of timely or urgent action.” In response to the Province of Ontario's international call for development proposals, the WMF listing demanded “an end to top-down decision-making and the embrace of heritage to encourage community dialogue.” Following the Watch inclusion, World Monuments Fund partnered with the Architectural Conservancy Ontario and the Faculty of Architecture, Landscape and Design at the University of Toronto to protect the heritage values of Ontario Place through an initiative called "The Future of Ontario Place Project". Through a research initiative, design challenge, and public campaign, the Future of Ontario Place Project started working in 2020 to build public knowledge of the heritage values of the site, and to imagine the future of Ontario Place as a public cultural asset for all Ontarians.

2021 Plan 
In July 2021 development plans were announced. Three companies are to redevelop different sectors: 
LiveNation (which already operates music venues at the site) will revamp Budweiser Stage Amphitheatre into indoor/outdoor facility with capacity up to 20,000 people in the summer and nearly 9,000 in winter.
Austrian company Therme Group will develop the west island. The plan includes indoor and outdoor pools, waterslides, restaurants, botanical gardens, and an over 8 acre free public park and beach. Projected admission price for indoor activities is about $40 per person for full day admittance.
Quebec outdoor recreation firm Écorécréo will develop the southern area between the two islands.

Private sector investments are expected to be about $500-million. Public sector investment was not disclosed. A review process for environmental, heritage, and public consultation, will likely extend into 2023. Construction is scheduled to begin in 2024, with a 2030 completion.

In February 2022, Toronto city council voted to adopt a process to create an approvals process for the Province's plan for the redevelopment of Ontario Place. This process generally follows the city's traditional development approvals process, notwithstanding Ontario Place is predominately constructed on Provincially-owned land. Based on this timeline, a rezoning application is expected in late 2022 and site a plan approvals process could begin July 2023.

In September 2022, Écorécréo announced they would be dropping out of the project, as they were unable to agree on leasing terms with the Ministry of Infrastructure. In a related update, the ministry reported that “Repair work on the Cinesphere, pods, and bridges is proceeding on-schedule this fall. Site servicing, including sewage, water, electrical, and gas, is expected to begin in the spring of 2023."

Venues and facilities
The park is open daily without admission accessible by the west entrance and the Trillium Park entrance. Several venues operate with separate ticketing. The eastern entrance is used exclusively for the Budweiser Stage.

Budweiser Stage

Budweiser Stage is a 15,000-person capacity outdoor concert venue. The stage and the inner seating area is covered by a permanent roof. The Stage operates a summer season of popular music concerts. It was formerly known as the Molson Amphitheatre.

Cinesphere

Cinesphere is a 600-person capacity IMAX and IMAX3D theatre. Opened at the same time as the theme park, it screens a selection of IMAX films on weekends. It also has been used by the Toronto International Film Festival. It is an "IMAX with laser" and 70mm film theatre. The theatre is housed in a "triodetic-domed" spherical structure, similar to a geodesic dome.

Echo Beach
Developed in collaboration with concert promoter Live Nation, Echo Beach is a 5000-person general-admission outdoor concert venue designed to help re-create the popular ambience of the original Ontario Place Forum, minus the revolving stage but introducing a real sandy beach section with views of the Toronto nighttime skyline. Some of the first performers Echo Beach in 2011 included Sloan, Robyn and Platinum Blonde. The Toronto Life magazine wrote, "The new Echo Beach is a reason to love Toronto because music sounds better under the stars". For 2012, based on strong reviews and rising attendance, Live Nation increased substantially the number of concerts scheduled for Echo Beach, including Our Lady Peace, Sam Roberts, and Counting Crows.

TeachBeach

Downtown Toronto's only beach, located at Ontario Place, also features an outdoor classroom (known as the "TeachBeach") which is also the venue of the annual Water-Human-Computer Interaction (WaterHCI) (de)conference.  The beach is a pebble beach which facilitates pebble-walking (barefoot walking on pebbles for therepeutic effect), and is a popular location for year-round swimming with approximately 900 members of SwimOP (Swim at Ontario Place), Swim Drink Fish, and Lake Ontario Waterkeeper.  The swimming water quality is tested regularly year-round by Swim Drink Fish, and is the site for a wide range of educational and research activities.

Other facilities
Ontario Place offers 240 slips for pleasure craft in two marinas. It offers slips for seasonal and visit rentals. The marinas are open between May and October.

Trillium Park is a newly developed park on the East Island. The park provides a trail, a firepit, a picnic/meeting shelter and some special plantings.

While not full redeveloped, one area of the West Island has been repurposed. It is used for cultural festivals and events. A skating rink operates during winter months and boat rentals operate during the summer months.

Former attractions

Children's Village
Not ready for the first season, the Children's Village opened in July 1972, built at a cost of $700,000 on the East Island. Occupying about 2 acres, the active playground offered large nets to climb on, tube slides, a "foam swamp" of foam pieces below a plastic sheet, a "pogo-bird bounce", "punch-bag forest", a plastic climbing pyramid, a rubber forest, a large air mattress to jump on, and a total of 21 activities. Half of the village was covered by a  bright orange vinyl canopy. The Village was designed by Eric MacMillan. The Village changed over time, and the active activities were replaced by the water park and amusements on the East Island. The roofed area was closed and replaced by Heritage Square which had live entertainment. Children's activities were also developed on the West Island, including a large climbing facility, games, creative activities and rides.

The Forum
The Forum was an outdoor concert venue that was an architectural landmark. It featured covered seating under a unique tent-like, metal framed, solid roof, with extra seating on the open surrounding, grassy hills. While having only half the seating capacity of the current Amphitheatre, it had (arguably) better sound, bench seating, and offered a far more intimate theatre in the round experience; featuring a rotating stage which gave every seat in the house, in turn, an excellent view.

Featured events included an annual Toronto Symphony rendition of Tchaikovsky's 1812 Overture, complete with the firing of the guns from the nearby HMCS Haida, and often performances by well established acts, such as BB King, Glen Campbell, Kenny Rogers, Johnny Cash, James Brown, Dizzy Gillespie, Pat Metheny, Blondie, Chic, KC and the Sunshine Band and Canadian acts like Burton Cummings, Lighthouse, Bruce Cockburn, The Nylons, Luba, Men Without Hats, The Box, Doug and the Slugs, Parachute Club, Red Rider and Strange Advance. Unfortunately, due to a riot by Teenage Head fans in 1980 (purportedly instigated by their manager, who allegedly was interested in the publicity) harder rock acts were thereafter banned from the venue. In summer of 1983, the Forum was ahead of the curve by bringing in acts like Paul Young and the Royal Family and Tina Turner just before her huge comeback the following year.

The Forum was torn down at the end of the 1994 season. According to Lou Seller, the Ontario Place marketing and entertainment manager, the decision was made because "the Forum is quaint. It could not take big acts. The sightlines will be better, the acoustics will be better, we'll be able to offer a state-of-the-art concert experience." Sellers also said that Ontario Place was looking forward to an increase in attendance at the park, which cost the provincial treasury $4.5 million annually, 30% of its budget, an amount it wanted to decrease. The plan was criticized by the original Ontario Place architect Eb Zeidler, who suggested building the facility on the east island so as to keep the Forum, which he described as an engineering achievement that should be kept, and Ontario Place's landscape architect Michael Hough who criticized the cutting of trees necessary for the new facility. The plan was met with protests at Toronto City Hall, but the City of Toronto Council did not stop the project. The project was paid for by Molson Breweries and MCA (today's Live Nation).

Froster Soak City 

The waterpark began with a concrete waterslide, Canada's first, opened in 1978 on the East Island infill. It was expanded with new water attractions (Hydrofuge in 1993 and Rush River Raft Ride, Pink Twister waterslide and Purple Pipeline waterslide in 1995) and eventually to the current Soak City theme in 2001. By the time of its closure, it had five water slides, a pool and a splash pad. In the Splash Pad area of the park, many of the features were interactive and controlled by user-operable valves. The valves are free-turning ball-valves connected to large handwheels.

Water park rides and features

Hydrofuge - open 1993
Lakeside Beach Spa Pool
Pink Twister - open 1995
Purple Pipeline - open 1995
Rush River - open 1995
Topsy Turvy - open August 2011
Tipping Bucket
Splash Pad

Other attractions and venues 

 , a decommissioned Second World War destroyer that was open to the public. In the early 1960s, the ship was going to be scrapped, but volunteers raised enough money to have it saved and towed to Toronto. It opened as an attraction in August 1965 at a pier at the foot of York Street. The city had planned to build a 'Serviceman's Memorial Park' near the Princes' Gates at Exhibition Place. When the organization 'Haida Inc.' ran into financial problems, the ship was taken over by the Government of Ontario and moved in 1970 to the Ontario Place site, where it was turned into an attraction.  It was also used as a Sea Cadet training camp. In 2002, it was bought by Parks Canada. It was moved to a new home in Hamilton, Ontario and incorporated into a new marine museum in that city.
 Future Pod, opened in 1982 in Pod 5, featuring displays and exhibits in technology, communications and energy, including a full-sized replica of the Canadarm used on the Space Shuttle.
 The Canadian Baseball Hall of Fame and Museum, originally opened in Ontario Place before moving to its permanent home in St. Marys, Ontario.
 Ontario North Now, a themed area, made up the bulk of the west island, including the wilderness adventure ride, a simulated mine, and Muskeg Pete's Main Street. The mining exhibit became a weather exhibit in the 2000s.

List of 2011 (final) season rides and attractions 

Numerous midway rides were temporarily installed at the park in its final season.

 East Island

 Acrobatic Stage Show at Heritage Square, played for part of the final season.
 Power Wheels – This ride was closed in June 2011, early in the final season of the first era of the park.
 Cyclone
 Mini Bumper Boats
 First Flight
 Free Fall
 Tilt-A-Whirl
 Mini Greens (mini golf)
 Super Slide
 4D Ontario
 Cyclone Speedway
 Aquajet Racers
 Waterplay Splash Pad

 Marina Village

 Cinesphere in IMAX 3D
 Atlantis – Restaurant/Club
 OP Driving School
 Bumper Boats
 H2O Generation Station
 Cool Hoops – Closed as of June 2011
 Marina with Lake Ontario access
 Boat School
 Eco-learning center
 Earth Ranger
 Mega Bounce
 Wacky Worm – Ontario Place's first roller-coaster

 West Island

 Wilderness Adventure Ride
 3D F/X Adventure Theatre
 National Helicopters
 Megamaze
 The Go Zone
 Treehouse Live! Waterfall Stage, previously on the East Island

In popular media 
Ontario Place served as a filming location for the episode "Angel of Death" from the TV series War of the Worlds. It was the setting for a shootout where Dr. Harrison Blackwood, his team, and a supposed alien ally confront the evil aliens which are personally led by the alien advocacy. Ontario Place was also used for the filming of Urban Legends Final Cut as the "Tunnel of Terror" back in 1999. This scene shows the ride turned into a horror ride where two of the characters are killed by electrocution but the authorities believe it to be accidental.

It was used in Star Trek: Strange New Worlds first-season episode "Ghosts of Illyria," doubling for exterior shots of the abandoned Hetemit IX colony.

See also
Venues of the 2015 Pan American and Parapan American Games

References

External links

 Ontario Place
 Ontario Place Revitalization
 Ontario Place Revitalization report (PDF)
Theme from Ontario Place – A side
Theme from Ontario Place – B side
Footage of Ontario Place Children's Village, ca. 1970, Archives of Ontario YouTube Channel
Promotional video for Ontario Place, 1971, Archives of Ontario YouTube Channel
 History of Ontario place

Buildings and structures in Toronto
Crown corporations of Ontario
Redeveloped ports and waterfronts in Toronto
Modernist architecture in Canada
Tourist attractions in Toronto
Venues of the 2015 Pan American Games
Defunct amusement parks in Canada
1971 establishments in Ontario
2011 disestablishments in Ontario
Water parks in Canada
Eberhard Zeidler buildings
Amusement parks opened in 1971
Amusement parks closed in 2011
Festival venues in Canada